Eastlea Community School is a co-educational secondary school in the London Borough of Newham in Canning Town, London E16. The school caters for 11- to 16-year-olds.

The school runs a scholarship initiative in partnership with charity Eastside Young Leader Academy.

Eastlea Community School underwent an extensive £13m Building Schools For the Future redevelopment creating a campus-style learning environment.

Eastlea was rated as "Inadequate" following an Ofsted inspection, published 20 November 2019.

Previously a community school administered by Newham London Borough Council, in January 2021 Eastlea Community School converted to academy status. The school is now sponsored by the Newham Community Schools Trust.

Notable former pupils
 J Hus, Musician 
 Medy Elito (Don EE), Footballer & Musician
 Yxng Bane, Musician
 Teddy Music (Silencer), Musician

References

External links
 

Secondary schools in the London Borough of Newham
Academies in the London Borough of Newham
Canning Town